The X-cross, X-frame, saltire cross or Saint Andrew's cross is a common piece of equipment in BDSM dungeons. It is erotic furniture that typically provides restraining points for ankles, wrists, and waist. When secured to an X-cross, the subject is restrained in a standing spreadeagle position.

X-crosses are versatile and easy to manufacture. They are usually firmly attached to a wall. The "bondage wheel" variant has a central axle, allowing occupants to be turned upside down.

The submissive may be attached to the X-cross with either the back or front facing the cross. Being restrained facing the cross is the position often used for whipping. Being attached with one's back to the cross is usually more of a sexual bondage position or used for sexual teasing.

The X-cross may be purchased from BDSM companies, but many users make their own. Freestanding X-crosses have a frame which supports the cross. Some homemade freestanding X-crosses have a tendency to be unstable; a writhing subject can sometimes tip them over, so great caution needs to be exercised in their use. Some freestanding X-crosses include footrests that greatly improve safety and stability.

References

Further reading 
 Jay Wiseman: SM 101: A Realistic Introduction. Greenery Press (CA) 1998,  
 Philip Miller, Molly Devon: Screw the Roses, Send Me the Thorns: The Romance and Sexual Sorcery of Sadomasochism, Mystic Rose Books, 1995. .
 Dossie Easton, Janet W. Hardy: The New Topping Book. Greenery Press (CA) 2002,  

BDSM equipment
Cross symbols
Physical restraint